The Kathmandu Post is a major daily newspaper published in Nepal. Founded in February 1993 by Shyam Goenka, it is one of the largest English-language newspapers in the country. The newspaper is independently owned and published by Kantipur Publications, the owners of Nepal's largest selling newspaper, the Nepali-language Kantipur.  Post is a member of the Asia News Network, an alliance of nineteen Asian newspapers. The Kathmandu Post is Nepal's first privately owned English broadsheet daily, and is Nepal's largest selling English language newspaper, with a daily circulation of 95,000 copies.

The Post's first five pages are primarily dedicated to national news and each day, the last page offers a variety of features, including explainers, interviews, auto reviews, and restaurant reviews and destinations. During the weekdays, the newspaper also features culture & arts pages, which cover national and international news on society, life & style, fashion and technology. On the weekends, the Post focuses on long-form journalism, satire and creative non-fiction articles.

Since 2018, under the editorship of Anup Kaphle, the Post has started focusing on longer investigative pieces, analyses and explainers, making those the core of its daily reporting.

Controversy 
In October 2007, the offices of The Kathmandu Post were attacked by the All Nepal Printing and Publication Workers' Union, a group connected to the former Maoist rebels of the Unified Communist Party of Nepal (Maoist). The printing press was vandalized, stopping the paper from being published. Two hundred journalists and legal professionals marched in Kathmandu in protest at the attacks.

Chinese Embassy controversy 
On 18 February 2020, The Kathmandu Post republished an article by Ivo Daalder, a former US ambassador to NATO, which was originally published in The Korea Herald, a member of the Asia News Network, with an accompanying stock illustration from Shutterstock that showed Mao Zedong wearing a mask. The Chinese Embassy in Nepal took serious exception to the article and the illustration, issuing a press statement that said the article had been published with "malicious intention" and had "deliberately smeared the efforts of the Chinese government and people fighting against the new coronavirus pneumonia and even viciously attacked the political system of China". The press statement was widely condemned by journalists and diplomats for breaching "diplomatic decorum" and was seen as an attempt by the Chinese government to stifle press freedom in a neighboring country.

References

External links 
 The Kathmandu Post

Daily newspapers published in Nepal
English-language newspapers published in Asia
Kathmandu
Online newspapers published in Nepal
1993 establishments in Nepal